HD 158259 is a main sequence star located 88 light years away in the constellation Draco, discovered by the SOPHIE échelle spectrograph using the radial velocity method.

Characteristics
HD 158259 is a G0 star with a rotation period of  days. More detail analysis of the spectral assigns a class of G5V, but with the metal lines of an F9 star.

Planets
Five planets have been confirmed orbiting HD 158259, along with one unconfirmed planet. The planets orbit in a nearly 3:2 orbital resonance, with the period ratios 1.5758, 1.5146, 1.5296, 1.5130, and 1.4480, respectively, starting from the innermost pairing. A dynamical analysis has shown that the system is stable. One of the planets, HD 158259 b, is a super-Earth; the rest, including the unconfirmed HD 158259 g, are mini-Neptunes.

References

Draco (constellation)
G-type main-sequence stars
158259
085268
Planetary systems with five confirmed planets